John Kao (born 1950) is an author and strategic advisor based in San Francisco. His work concentrates on issues of innovation and organizational transformation.

Life and career

Kao was born in 1950 to Chinese immigrant parents. An accomplished jazz pianist, he spent the summer of 1969 playing keyboards for Frank Zappa. Kao studied philosophy at Yale College, received an MD from Yale Medical School, and an MBA from Harvard Business School. He taught at Harvard Business School from 1982 to 1996, where he specialized in innovation and entrepreneurship. He has also held faculty appointments at the Massachusetts Institute of Technology Media Lab, Yale College, and the Naval Postgraduate School.

His advisory work for Senator Hillary Clinton, including his ideas on innovation and transformation, was described in The New York Times as "out of the box".

In 2000, Kao became CEO of Ealing Films.  He also founded Kao Ventures, and San Francisco-based The Idea Factory, working with Internet-related startups. He also shared producer credits for Sex, Lies, and Videotape and Mr. Baseball.

Publications 

Key publications include:

References

External links
Official website

1950 births
Living people
American business writers
American people of Chinese descent
Harvard Business School alumni
Harvard University faculty
MIT School of Architecture and Planning faculty
Naval Postgraduate School faculty
Science and technology studies scholars
Writers from California
Yale School of Medicine alumni
Yale University faculty
Yale College alumni
American chief executives